Vitali Nikolayevich Koval (born March 31, 1980) is a Belarusian professional ice hockey goaltender. He has previously played for Molot-Prikamye Perm, Dinamo Minsk, Torpedo Nizhny Novgorod and Atlant Moscow Oblast, Salavat Yulaev Ufa with whom reached Gagarin Cup Final in 2011.

Koval was selected for the Belarus national men's ice hockey team in the 2010 Winter Olympics. He also participated at the 2010 IIHF World Championship.

References

External links

1980 births
Living people
Belarusian ice hockey goaltenders
HC Dinamo Minsk players
Ice hockey players at the 2010 Winter Olympics
Molot-Prikamye Perm players
Olympic ice hockey players of Belarus
Sportspeople from Perm, Russia
Torpedo Nizhny Novgorod players
Belarusian expatriate ice hockey people
Belarusian expatriate sportspeople in Russia
Expatriate ice hockey players in Russia
VIK Västerås HK players
HC Neftekhimik Nizhnekamsk players
Salavat Yulaev Ufa players
Atlant Moscow Oblast players
Belarus men's national ice hockey team coaches